Wyoming Highway 152 (WYO 152) was a  Wyoming State Road located in central Goshen County that served the community of Yoder and areas south and west of the community.

Route description
Wyoming Highway 152 began its western end southwest of Yoder at an intersection with three Goshen county routes; County Route 124 (west), County Route 128 (south), and County Route 202 (north). From there Highway 152 headed east until it intersected the western terminus of Wyoming Highway 153, where then WYO 152 turned north towards Yoder. WYO 152 turned east then north again before reaching Yoder and intersected the southern end of Wyoming Highway 154 in Yoder. WYO 154 heads west, as WYO 152 turned east and left Yoder, crossing the Fort Laramie Canal a mile before reaching its eastern end at an intersection with U.S. Route 85 and Wyoming Highway 161 just east of Yoder.

Major intersections

References

External links 

Wyoming State Routes 100-199
WYO 152 - Goshen CR 124 to WYO 153
WYO 152 - WYO 153 to WYO 154
WYO 152 - WYO 154 to US 85/WYO 161

Transportation in Goshen County, Wyoming
152